Angie Kristine Allen Salvacion Gorbulev  (born September 24, 2002) better known as Anji Salvacion, is a Filipino singer, actress and television personality best known for winning the tenth season of Pinoy Big Brother.

Anji Salvacion competed on Idol Philippines in 2019, progressing through the Theatre Rounds. She starred in Unloving U (2021) and sang songs for the soundtracks of Unloving U, Marry Me, Marry You (2021) and My Sunset Girl (2021). Her first extended play (EP) entitled Kasingkasing Dalampasigan was released on April 29, 2022, reaching number 1 on iTunes PH hours after its release.

Early life 
Anji Salvacion was born on September 24, 2002 in Siargao, Surigao del Norte to a Filipino mother and a Russian father. In her teenage years, Anji competed in singing contests and beauty pageants as her mother, Melisa's way of improving her daughter's confidence.

Career

2019–2021: ASAP and Idol Philippines

In 2019, Anji Salvacion auditioned for Idol Philippines as Angie Kristine, performing Christina Perri's "Jar of Hearts". She would then progress through the Theatre Rounds until her elimination in the Do or Die Round. Following her run in the show, Anji took on minor, non-credited background roles on soap operas, as well as serving as a stand-in for actors in commercials.

In 2021, Anji Salvacion landed a starring role in Unloving U in which she played the character named Waltz, a miniseries which aired in February that year. She also recorded songs for the soundtrack for the series, and for the soundtracks of Marry Me, Marry You and My Sunset Girl. In April 2021, she became a mainstay performer on ASAP Natin 'To, along with being a part of the influencer group, The Squad Plus.

2021–present: Pinoy Big Brother and Dalampasigan

Later that year, Salvacion competed as a celebrity housemate in Pinoy Big Brother: Kumunity Season 10. After surviving five eviction votes and becoming a Head of Household once, Salvacion would advance to the final phase of the competition after being voted to be part of the Celebrity Top 2, temporarily exiting the competition as other groups of housemates entered to compete in the house.

During her temporary leave from the show, she released her debut single Dalampasigan, a self-penned composition about her love for her dad and also dedicates the song to devastated island in fundraising concert. Salvacion also released her first extended play (EP) entitled Kasingkasing Dalampasigan on April 29, 2022, which peaked number 1 on iTunes Philippines. A day after the release of her EP, she performed in her first digital concert entitled Anji Salvacion: The Feels Concert, which aired on KTX.

Salvacion's stint on the reality show would be resumed on May 15, 2022, wherein she returned to compete against her fellow Biga-10 housemates as part of the Celebrity Top 2. Following her batch's win in the Kumuni-Test competitions, she advanced to the finale along with her fellow celebrity housemates Samantha Bernardo and Brenda Mage. In the season finale which aired on May 29, 2022, she won the season with a landslide victory against adult housemate and then runner-up Isabel Laohoo, among four other finalists, including Bernardo, Blackburn and Mage.

Personal life 
During her stint in Pinoy Big Brother: Kumunity Season 10, Salvacion revealed her longing for long-lost father and the questions she has been wanting to ask her mother. Production would later step in and have Melisa, Salvacion's mother, personally address her questions.

Discography

Extended plays

Singles

Soundtracks

Music video appearances

Television/digital

See also 

 List of Pinoy Big Brother Housemates

References

External links
 

2002 births
Living people
21st-century Filipino women singers
ABS-CBN personalities
Big Brother (franchise) winners
Filipino child actresses
Filipino people of Jewish descent
Filipino people of Russian descent
People from Surigao del Norte
Pinoy Big Brother contestants